Lavington may refer to:

People 

George Lavington (1684–1762), Bishop of Exeter, England
Lavington Glyde (1825–1890), Treasurer of South Australia
Ralph Payne, 1st Baron Lavington (1739–1807), British politician and Governor of the Leeward Islands, sole Baron Lavington
Leon Edward Lavington Sr. (1889–1961), Colorado State Treasurer, United States of America

Places 

Lavington, New South Wales, Australia, a suburb of the city of Albury
Lavington, British Columbia, Canada, an unincorporated community
Lenton, Lincolnshire, sometimes known as Lavington, a village in England
Lavington, Nairobi, Kenya, a suburb of Nairobi

See also
 East Lavington, West Sussex, England
 West Lavington, West Sussex
 West Lavington, Wiltshire, England
 Market Lavington, Wiltshire